Markham, Ontario is the city north of Toronto and growth has led to emergence of low and high rise buildings to reduce urban sprawl. Most of the city's tall buildings are located in the area of Downtown Markham along Highway 7 from Woodbine Avenue to Warden Avenue and mainly residential structures.

As a mainly suburban area, Markham's buildings are mainly residential condos, hotels with a few office towers. Height restrictions are in place  near Buttonville Municipal Airport that will be eliminated with the closure of the airport.

Tallest buildings
This list ranks buildings in Markham that stand at least 50 m (164 ft) tall, based on CTBUH height measurement standards. This includes spires and architectural details but does not include antenna masts.

Planned buildings/buildings under construction
As of 2012 there are 13 planned buildings and 10 under construction in Markham.

See also

 List of tallest buildings in Ontario
 Canadian architecture

References

Markham
Buildings and structures in Markham, Ontario
Tallest buildings in Markham